"When We Were Young" is a song by American electronic music producer Dillon Francis and Canadian electronic duo Sultan + Shepard featuring guest vocals of  The Chain Gang of 1974. The song was written by Dillon Francis and The Chain Gang of 1974, with production handled by Dillon Francis and Sultan + Shepard. It was released as a digital download on 5 August 2014 and is the second single from his debut studio album Money Sucks, Friends Rule. Francis released the music video on 21 October 2014 in YouTube.

Background
After confirming his new album name and release date, Dillon Francis collaborates with Sultan + Shepard and The Chain Gang of 1974 to launch together his new song on 5 August 2014 named, "When We Were Young". Later, Francis announced an EP that features the official remixes of "When We Were Young".

On 21 October 2014, Francis released the official song video on his YouTube Channel. In this video Francis describes himself as a 3-year-old boy, on thdays parties.

The EP remix included 5 songs, and was released on 10 November 2014, and features remixes by Valentino Khan, Vicetone, Pierce Fulton, Juventa, Grandtheft and Zomboy.

Track listing

Chart performance

Weekly charts

Release history

References

2014 songs
Electronic songs
Songs written by Dillon Francis